Hattar may refer to:

People
Hattar clan, a Rajput clan, found in the Punjab and Sindh provinces of Pakistan
Nahed Hattar (1960–2016), murdered Jordanian writer and political activist
Sakher Hattar (born 1963), Jordanian oud player
Samer Hattar, Jordanian biologist

Other uses
Hattar, Pakistan, a subdivision of Haripur District, Khyber Pakhtunkhwa province 
Hattar railway station

See also

Abu'l-Khattar al-Husam ibn Darar al-Kalbi, governor of Al Andalus 743–745